"Jack the Giant Killer" is an English fairy tale.

Jack the Giant Killer may also refer to:

Films
 Jack the Giant Killer (1922 film), a Laugh-O-Gram Studio cartoon short created by Walt Disney
Jack the Giant Killer (1962 film), a film adaptation of the fairy tale starring Kerwin Mathews
Jack the Giant Slayer, originally titled Jack the Giant Killer, a 2013 film adaptation of the  fairy tale
Jack the Giant Killer (2013 film), a mockbuster of the 2013 film Jack the Giant Slayer

Other uses
 Jack, the Giant Killer (novel), a 1987 novel by Charles de Lint
 Jack the Giantkiller, a 1982 arcade game

See also
Johnny the Giant Killer, a 1950 animated film
Giant-killing (disambiguation)
Jack and the Beanstalk (disambiguation)